The Awesome Again Stakes is a Grade I American Thoroughbred horse race for horses aged three years old or older over the distance of one and one-eighth miles on the dirt scheduled annually in September at Santa Anita Park in Arcadia, California.  The event currently carries a purse of $300,000.

History

The event was inaugurated on 9 October 1982 as the Goodwood Handicap at the Oak Tree Racing Association meeting at Santa Anita Park as the eighth race on the racecard over a distance of  miles and was won by the and US Hall of Fame, Lázaro "Laz" Barrera trained Cajun Prince who tied the track record for the distance that was set by Ancient Title in 1978.  The race was named for Oak Tree Racing Association's sister operation at Goodwood Racecourse near Chichester, England.

The event was run at the  miles distance in 1983, 1984 and again in 1986. 

In 1985 the event was classified by the American Graded Stakes Committee as Grade III and was upgraded to Grade II status in 1990.

Between 1996 and 2006, the Breeders' Cup sponsored the event which reflected in the name of the event.

In 2012 the event was upgraded to Grade I and was renamed in honor of the Canadian bred 1998 Breeders' Cup Classic winner Awesome Again. Also Awesome Again is the sire of the dual winner of this event, Game On Dude.

Records
Time record: 
 miles: 1:46.72 - Bertrando (1994)
 miles: 1:40.20  -  Cajun Prince  (1982)

Margins:
  lengths - Smooth Roller  (2015)

Most wins:
 2 - Lord At War (ARG) (1984, 1985)
 2 - Pleasantly Perfect (2002, 2003)
 2 - Game On Dude (2011, 2012)

Most wins by an owner:
 2 - Peter Perkins (1984, 1985)
 2 - Diamond A Racing (2002, 2003)
 2 - Family Trust Diamond Pride, Lanni Family Trust, Mercedes Stable & Bernie Schiappa (2011, 2012)

Most wins by a jockey:
 5 - Gary Stevens (1988, 1994, 1998, 2005, 2013)

Most wins by a trainer:
 8 - Bob Baffert (1998, 2010, 2011, 2012, 2017, 2020, 2021, 2022)

Winners

Legend:

 
 

Notes:
§ Ran as an entry

† In the 1996 running Alphabet Soup won the race but was disqualified and placed third. Savinio was declared the winner.

See also
List of American and Canadian Graded races

External site
 2015 Santa Anita Park Media Guide
 Find out more about the Awesome Again Stakes (formerly known as Goodwood) at Hello Race Fans!

References

Open mile category horse races
Grade 1 stakes races in the United States
1982 establishments in California
Horse races in California
Recurring sporting events established in 1982
Santa Anita Park
Breeders' Cup Challenge series